Sanocki (feminine: Sanocka; plural: Sanoccy) is a Polish surname. Notable people with this surname include:

 Janusz Sanocki (1954–2020), Polish politician
 Krystian Sanocki (born 1996), Polish footballer

See also
 
 

Polish-language surnames